High Bridge is a borough in Hunterdon County, in the U.S. state of New Jersey. As of the 2020 United States census, the borough's population was 3,546, a decrease of 102 (−2.8%) from the 2010 census count of 3,648, which in turn reflected a decline of 128 (−3.4%) from the 3,776 counted in the 2000 census.

History

High Bridge was originally incorporated as a township by an act of the New Jersey Legislature on March 29, 1871, from portions of Clinton Township and Lebanon Township. On February 19, 1898, the borough of High Bridge was incorporated from portions of the township, with the remainder returned to Clinton and Lebanon Townships five days later.

The borough is located on the South Branch of the Raritan River in the north central part of Hunterdon County. Water from the South Branch was a valuable power source for one of the first ironworks in the United States, established in the 1740s by William Allen and Joseph Turner of Philadelphia. Allen was the mayor of Philadelphia, a Chief Justice of Pennsylvania, and a prominent landowner in New Jersey.

Geography
According to the United States Census Bureau, the borough had a total area of 2.43 square miles (6.30 km2), including 2.39 square miles (6.19 km2) of land and 0.04 square miles (0.10 km2) of water (1.65%). It is drained by the South Branch of the Raritan River.

High Bridge borders the Hunterdon County municipalities of Clinton Township and Lebanon Township.

Unincorporated communities, localities and place names located partially or completely within the township include Jericho Hill, Pierce Heights and Silverthorn.

Climate

Demographics

2010 census

The Census Bureau's 2006–2010 American Community Survey showed that (in 2010 inflation-adjusted dollars) median household income was $90,037 (with a margin of error of +/− $10,054) and the median family income was $108,148 (+/− $6,913). Males had a median income of $77,500 (+/− $10,021) versus $47,936 (+/− $5,291) for females. The per capita income for the borough was $40,866 (+/− $4,587). About none of families and 0.8% of the population were below the poverty line, including none of those under age 18 and none of those age 65 or over.

2000 census
As of the 2000 United States census there were 3,776 people, 1,428 households, and 1,051 families residing in the borough. The population density was 1,566.0 people per square mile (604.9/km2). There were 1,478 housing units at an average density of 613.0 per square mile (236.8/km2). The racial makeup of the borough was 96.24% White, 0.79% African American, 0.34% Native American, 1.43% Asian, 0.03% Pacific Islander, 0.45% from other races, and 0.72% from two or more races. Hispanic or Latino of any race were 2.12% of the population.

There were 1,428 households, out of which 39.9% had children under the age of 18 living with them, 62.3% were married couples living together, 8.5% had a female householder with no husband present, and 26.4% were non-families. 20.9% of all households were made up of individuals, and 4.8% had someone living alone who was 65 years of age or older. The average household size was 2.64 and the average family size was 3.10.

In the borough the population was spread out, with 27.6% under the age of 18, 5.3% from 18 to 24, 36.4% from 25 to 44, 24.2% from 45 to 64, and 6.5% who were 65 years of age or older. The median age was 36 years. For every 100 females, there were 94.0 males. For every 100 females age 18 and over, there were 92.7 males.

The median income for a household in the borough was $68,719, and the median income for a family was $75,357. Males had a median income of $56,607 versus $35,450 for females. The per capita income for the borough was $29,276. About 1.9% of families and 3.2% of the population were below the poverty line, including 1.9% of those under age 18 and 9.2% of those age 65 or over.

Economy
High Bridge has a downtown (Main Street) that is home to eateries, services and professionals.  Circa Restaurant, at the center of Main Street, has received acclaim from a variety of sources including a food editor from The New York Times who proclaimed, "Circa is the kind of place I wish were in my town."

The businesses are collectively marketed by the High Bridge Business Association, which assists its member businesses through co-operative advertising, press releases, goodwill and other benefits.

Parks and recreation

High Bridge serves as the southern terminus of a rail trail that was created out of the former Central Railroad of New Jersey High Bridge Branch. The trail is maintained by Hunterdon County Parks and Recreation and is called the Columbia Trail. The trail runs northeastward from the center of the borough (at the junction of Main Street and Church Street) towards Califon, through a scenic area outside the borough limits, known as the Ken Lockwood Gorge.

Union Forge Park is High Bridge's main public park, located by the South Branch Raritan River and the Taylor Wharton complex. Another park is the Borough Commons, situated at the start of the Columbia Trail. A grant received by the Union Forge Heritage Association in 2008 provided for the creation of the Taylor Steelworkers Historical Greenway, which stretches  around the borough, starting at Columbia Trail and connecting the borough's parks and other historic sites.

The High Bridge Hills golf course, located near Route 31, provides another means of recreation in the small town.

Government

Local government
High Bridge is governed under the Borough form of New Jersey municipal government, which is used in 218 municipalities (of the 564) statewide, making it the most common form of government in New Jersey. The governing body is comprised of the Mayor and the six-member Borough Council. The Mayor is elected directly by the voters to a four-year term of office. The Borough Council is comprised of six members elected to serve three-year terms on a staggered basis, with two seats coming up for election each year in a three-year cycle. The Borough form of government used by High Bridge is a "weak mayor / strong council" government in which council members act as the legislative body with the mayor presiding at meetings and voting only in the event of a tie. The mayor can veto ordinances subject to an override by a two-thirds majority vote of the council. The Borough Council decides committee and liaison assignments for council members. Appointments are made by the mayor with the advice and consent of the council.

, the Mayor of High Bridge Borough is Democrat Michelle Lee, whose term of office ends December 31, 2022. Members of the Borough Council are Natalie Ferry (D, 2023), Lynn Marie Hughes (R, 2022), Christopher Graham (D, 2024; appointed to serve an unexpired term), Alan Schwartz (R, 2023), Steven Silvestri (R, 2024) and Stephen Strange (R, 2022).

High Bridge Borough Council meeting agendas and minutes are available on the borough website.

In February 2022 Borough Council selected Christopher Graham from a list of three candidates nominated by the Republican municipal committee to fill seat expiring in December 2024 that had been held by Leigh Ann Moore until she stepped down from office. Graham will serve on an interim basis until the November 2022 general election, when voters will choose a candidate to serve the balance of the term of office.

In April 2016, the Borough Council selected Keir LoIacono from a list of three candidates nominated by the Republican municipal committee to fill the seat of Mike Stemple, who had resigned from office the previous month.

In November 2014, the Borough Council selected Stephen Strange to fill the vacant seat expiring in 2016 of Victoria Miller, who had resigned from office in the previous month. In the November 2015 general election, Strange was elected to serve the balance of the term.

Federal, state and county representation
High Bridge is located in the 7th Congressional District and is part of New Jersey's 18th state legislative district. Prior to the 2011 reapportionment following the 2010 Census, High Bridge had been in the 23rd state legislative district.

Politics
As of November 7, 2017, there were a total of 2,587 registered voters in High Bridge.

In the 2012 presidential election, Democrat Barack Obama received 50.4% of the vote (893 cast), ahead of Republican Mitt Romney with 47.8% (846 votes), and other candidates with 1.8% (32 votes), among the 1,788 ballots cast by the borough's 2,497 registered voters (17 ballots were spoiled), for a turnout of 71.6%. In the 2008 presidential election, Democrat Barack Obama received 48.6% of the vote (938 cast), ahead of Republican John McCain with 48.4% (936 votes) and other candidates with 2.1% (41 votes), among the 1,932 ballots cast by the borough's 2,487 registered voters, for a turnout of 77.7%. In the 2004 presidential election, Republican George W. Bush received 55.9% of the vote (1,012 ballots cast), outpolling Democrat John Kerry with 43.0% (778 votes) and other candidates with 1.1% (25 votes), among the 1,811 ballots cast by the borough's 2,315 registered voters, for a turnout percentage of 78.2.

In the 2013 gubernatorial election, Republican Chris Christie received 69.3% of the vote (778 cast), ahead of Democrat Barbara Buono with 28.5% (320 votes), and other candidates with 2.1% (24 votes), among the 1,136 ballots cast by the borough's 2,469 registered voters (14 ballots were spoiled), for a turnout of 46.0%. In the 2009 gubernatorial election, Republican Chris Christie received 60.6% of the vote (819 ballots cast), ahead of Democrat Jon Corzine with 27.1% (367 votes), Independent Chris Daggett with 10.3% (139 votes) and other candidates with 1.1% (15 votes), among the 1,352 ballots cast by the borough's 2,433 registered voters, yielding a 55.6% turnout.

Education
The High Bridge School District serves students in pre-kindergarten through eighth grade. As of the 2018–19 school year, the district, comprised of two schools, had an enrollment of 370 students and 38.2 classroom teachers (on an FTE basis), for a student–teacher ratio of 9.7:1. Schools in the districts (with 2018–19 enrollment data from the National Center for Education Statistics) are 
High Bridge Elementary School with 194 students in grades Pre-K–4 and 
High Bridge Middle School with 178 students in grades 5–8.

Public school students in ninth through twelfth grades attend Voorhees High School, which also serves students from Califon, Glen Gardner, Hampton, Lebanon Township and Tewksbury Township. As of the 2018–19 school year, the high school had an enrollment of 982 students and 83.1 classroom teachers (on an FTE basis), for a student–teacher ratio of 11.8:1. The school is part of the North Hunterdon-Voorhees Regional High School District, which also includes students from Bethlehem Township, Clinton Town, Clinton Township, Franklin Township, Lebanon Borough and Union Township who attend North Hunterdon High School in Annandale.

Eighth grade students from all of Hunterdon County are eligible to apply to attend the high school programs offered by the Hunterdon County Vocational School District, a county-wide vocational school district that offers career and technical education at its campuses in Raritan Township and at programs sited at local high schools, with no tuition charged to students for attendance.

Transportation

Roads and highways

County Route 513 is the main road that passes through and connects to Route 31 to the west. Interstate 78 is accessible via Routes 513 and 31 in neighboring Clinton Township.

Public transportation
Originally a vital junction for the Central Railroad of New Jersey in hauling iron ore from northern New Jersey via its High Bridge Branch which headed north toward Wharton and High Bridge station now serves as the westernmost station on NJ Transit's Raritan Valley Line. It is located at the southern end of the station.  The parking lot for the station is located one block to the west.  The station only uses the southern track for inbound and outbound trains.  There is a station building that is no longer used and there are two small shelters.  This station has limited weekday service and no weekend service.  The station has been the western terminus of the line since 1983, the year NJ Transit commenced operations. Between 1983 and 1989, NJ Transit reached Phillipsburg, New Jersey on the former Central Railroad of New Jersey mainline. Since that time, the route between High Bridge and Phillipsburg has been inactive. NJ Transit considers making plans for bringing service back to Phillipsburg again in the future.

There is also service available between Flemington and Hampton on the Hunterdon LINK Route 15.

Points of interest
Solitude House, built –1725, became the centerpiece of the iron plantation that became Union Forge Ironworks. Later called Taylor Iron and Steel Company, it eventually became known as Taylor-Wharton. John Penn, the last royal governor of Pennsylvania, and Benjamin Chew, the last Chief Justice of the Supreme Court of Pennsylvania, were political prisoners at Solitude House during the American Revolutionary War. Five generations of the Taylor family managed the business and continued to live in the house, until 1938. Acquired by the Borough in 2001, and previously operated as a museum. The Union Forge Heritage Association operated Solitude House Museum from 2002 to 2012. The museum is now at the Turner–Chew–Carhart Farm in nearby Union Township.

The Taylor Steel Workers Historical Greenway, created by the Union Forge Heritage Association, connects to the Columbia Trail.

The TISCO Headquarters, constructed in 1742 for the Union Iron Works, is the oldest office building in New Jersey.

Lake Solitude Dam, replacing the crib dam of 1858, replaced in 1909, is the last remaining example of a buttress dam in New Jersey, built by master engineer Frank S. Tainter.

Springside Farm was established by Archibald S. Taylor, as the agricultural farm of the Taylor Iron and Steel Company. Covering , the site includes buildings dating back to 1803, some of which have deteriorated over the years.

The Paul Robinson Observatory is an astronomical observatory owned and operated by New Jersey Astronomical Association in nearby Voorhees State Park.

Notable people

People who were born in, residents of, or otherwise closely associated with High Bridge include:

 Frank Baldwin (1928–2004), Major League Baseball catcher who played for the Cincinnati Reds
 Florence Howe Hall (1845–1922), writer, critic, and lecturer about Women's suffrage in the United States
 Naomi Jakobsson (born 1941 as Naomi Dick), represents the 103rd District in the Illinois House of Representatives
 Howard Menger (1922–2009), UFO contactee whose writings on the subject include The High Bridge Incident, about his initial contact with aliens, when he was ten years old
 Dan Smith (born 1975), former MLB pitcher who played for the Montreal Expos and Boston Red Sox
 George W. Taylor (1808–1862), Union Army brigadier general during the American Civil War

References

External links

 Borough of High Bridge, New Jersey
 High Bridge Public Library
 Web page for High Bridge Borough, Hunterdon County, New Jersey
 High Bridge School District
 
 School Data for the High Bridge School District, National Center for Education Statistics
 North Hunterdon-Voorhees Regional High School District
 High Bridge Emergency Squad
 Hunterdon Land Trust Alliance
 Photo Essay of High Bridge from 1991
 High Bridge Business Association

 
1898 establishments in New Jersey
Borough form of New Jersey government
Boroughs in Hunterdon County, New Jersey
Populated places established in 1898